Moving Out is a 2020 cooperative moving simulation game developed by Swedish studio DevM Games and Australian developer SMG Studio. In a local cooperative experience, players move objects from houses into a moving van while coping with exaggerated physics. The game was released for Microsoft Windows, Nintendo Switch, PlayStation 4, and Xbox One on April 28, 2020, and for Amazon Luna on January 28, 2021.

A sequel, titled Moving Out 2, is scheduled to release in 2023.

Gameplay 
Players in Moving Out take on the role of movers, moving marked furniture and appliances (such as couches, refrigerators, and microwaves) from a house to a moving truck under a time limit. Along the way, obstacles (such as rakes, fires, ice, and even ghosts) may be encountered. Some heavy objects require two people to move, while other objects are fragile and may be easily broken. Objects may be thrown. Players are ranked on a bronze, silver and gold scale, based on how quickly all of the objects are packed into the moving truck. The levels also have optional objectives, such as breaking all of the house's windows or packing an unmarked object. Additional bonus levels may also be unlocked.

Moving Out features an "Assist Mode" feature, which helps reduce game difficulty. With this feature, the player can add extra time to the time limit, vanish objects on delivery, remove obstacles, make objects lighter or even skip levels.

A free downloadable update later introduced a new game mode for 12 of the original game levels which reverse the game play; asking players to remove items from a moving truck and place them in appropriate locations.

In February 2021, a expansion via DLC for all supported platforms was released under the name Movers in Paradise, which added 14 new levels to the story as well as new characters and new types of items to be moved.

Development
The idea came from developer Jan Rigerl helping a friend move. Rigerl noted he became fascinated with the process and the strategies involved in such things as "moving a couch around a hallway choke point or fitting multiple things into the elevator" and also noting that the concept would appeal to people because of the general poor reception most moving companies have. He started to develop such a game but as it grew in size he decided to team up with Ashley Ringrose, CEO of SMG Games. Ringrose had previously collaborated with Rigerl and had been trying unsuccessfully to get him join the studio. SMG's previous game Death Squared helped inform the game development, as they wanted to avoid the mistakes made with that game with Ringrose stating that the lessons were "Focus on a strong, vibrant and visual identity. Have a name that's fun and doesn't mention Death! And have strong characters people can identify with."

Upon the game's announcement comparisons began being made to Overcooked, a similar multiplayer game released a few years earlier. Ringrose has noted that prior to Moving Out'''s prototype being made he never played Overcooked and while embracing the comparison as a "shorthand reference", he also noted the various differences including Moving Out having a more focused single player experience. A sequel, titled Moving Out 2, is scheduled to release in 2023 for Microsoft Windows, Nintendo Switch, PlayStation 4, PlayStation 5, Xbox One, and Xbox Series X/S.

ReceptionMoving Out has received generally positive reviews, with most reviewers commending its multiplayer game play. Comparisons to Overcooked'' were common.

References

Further reading

External links 
 

2020 video games
Action video games
Cooperative video games
Multiplayer and single-player video games
Nintendo Switch games
PlayStation 4 games
Puzzle video games
Business simulation games
Team17 games
Video games developed in Australia
Video games developed in Sweden
Windows games
Xbox Cloud Gaming games
Xbox One games
Moving and relocation